Madeline Ashby (born April 24, 1983 in Panorama City, California) is an American-Canadian science fiction writer. She is best known for her 2016 novel Company Town, which was selected for the 2017 edition of Canada Reads.

She previously published the novels VN (2012) and iD (2013), as well as numerous short stories in anthologies and literary magazines. A graduate of OCAD University, she is a regular columnist for the Ottawa Citizen.

In addition to being a science fiction writer, Ashby has also had jobs working for Intel, the Ontario government, and design and communication firms. She now lives in Toronto, Ontario.

In 2013, Ashby received enough nominations to be a finalist for the John W. Campbell Award for Best New Writer, but recused herself on the grounds that her professional writing career had started with her 2009 publication of a short story in Nature — and thus her two-year Campbell eligibility period had expired in 2011.

Bibliography

Machine Dynasties series
The Education of Junior Number 12 (novelette 2011)
Give Granny a Kiss (short story 2012)
vN: The First Machine Dynasty (novel 2012)
iD: The Second Machine Dynasty (novel 2013)
reV: The Third Machine Dynasty (novel 2020)

Other novels
Company Town (novel 2016)

Short stories
"In Which Joe and Laurie Save Rock n'Roll" (2007)
"Fitting a New Suit" (2008)
"βoyfriend" (2008)
"Off Track Betting" (2009)
"The Chair" (2009)
"Ishin" (2010)
"Zombies, Condoms and Shenzhen: The Surprising Link Between the Undead and the Unborn" (2010)
"Social Services" (2013)
"Come from Away" (2014)
"By the Time We Get to Arizona" (2014)
"Memento Mori" (2015)
"A Stopped Clock" (2015)
"Be Seeing You" (2015)
"Thieving Magpie" (2016)
"Dreams in the Bitch House" (2016)
"Panic City" (2016)
"The Japanese Room" (2017)
"Death on Mars" (2017)
"Withnail & Us" (2018)
"Work Shadow/Shadow Work" (2018)
"Domestic Violence" (2018)
"Tierra y libertad" (2018)

Non-fiction
 How to Future (with Scott Smith), 2020.

References

External links

1983 births
21st-century American women writers
21st-century American novelists
21st-century Canadian novelists
American futurologists
American women novelists
American science fiction writers
Canadian futurologists
Canadian women novelists
Canadian science fiction writers
Living people
OCAD University alumni
Seattle University alumni
Writers from Seattle
Writers from Toronto
Writers from Washington (state)
York University alumni